In Jainism, the term Ganadhara is used to refer the chief disciple of a Tirthankara. In samavasarana, the Tīrthankara sat on a throne without touching it (about two inches above it). Around, the Tīrthankara sits the Ganadharas. According to Digambara tradition, only a disciple of exceptional brilliance and accomplishment (riddhi) is able to fully assimilate, without doubt, delusion, or misapprehension, the anekanta teachings of a Tirthankara. The presence of such a disciple is mandatory in the samavasarana before Tirthankara delivers his sermons. Ganadhara interpret and mediate to other people the divine sound (divyadhwani) which the Jains claim emanates from Tirthankara's body when he preaches.

The monastic sangha of Jainism is divided into a number of orders or troupes called ganas, each headed by a ganadhara.

In 20th century, statues depicting Tīrthankaras and Ganadharas were unearthed in Mayurbhanj district of Odisha.

List of the Ganadhara of 24 Tīrthankara

Ganadhara Vrisabha Sen

Vrishabha Sen was the Ganadhara of Tīrthankara Rishabhanatha. According to Jain legends, after the nirvana of Rishabhanatha, Bharata was in grief. Ganadhara Vrisabha Sen saw him and spoke to him: 

After this, Bharata recollected himself, touched the feet of Ganadhara Vrisabha Sen and left for his kingdom.

Notes

References